Kraked Unit is a French based  band founded in 2000 by French composer and DJ Loïk Dury in collaboration with other musicians and composers.
They focus on the creation of music for films, including films by Cédric Klapisch: L'auberge espagnole (2001), The Russian Dolls (2004), Paris (2008). They also compose music for catwalk shows by Karl Lagerfeld, Paco Rabanne and Kenzo. In 2021, they compose the sound identity of Radio France, including France Inter or FIP.

Releases, Appearances 
 2002 - remix of "The Man With The Drum" by Allenko Brotherhood Ensemble appeared on their album Brotherhood and on Eclectic Aesthetic compilation
 2005 - Les poupées russes (The Russian Dolls) OST, Up Music/WM France
 2008 - Paris La Bande Originale du Film de Cédric Klapisch OST, Up Music/WM France
 2009 - La Face Cachée des Fesses Arte
 2013 - Chinese Puzzle

References

External links
 at LastFM
http://www.kraked.com

French film score composers
French male film score composers
French electronic music groups